Fikret Karabudak Stadium, is a football stadium located in the city/town of Kırıkkale in Turkey, Europe. Fikret Karabudak Stadium has a maximum stadium capacity of 5402 spectators. MKE Kırıkkalespor are the main occupants of the stadium. MKE Kırıkkalespor plays their domestic home football fixtures at Fikret Karabudak Stadium.

References 

Football venues in Turkey
MKE Kırıkkalespor